Šalinac Grove ( / Šalinački lug) is a protected area in Serbia which contains the last remnant of the oak-and-ash forests which until several hundred years ago covered the flooded areas in the valleys of the Velika Morava and the Danube. It is a real rarity not only in Serbia but in the wider area of the Balkan peninsula.

The grove is surrounded by the settlements of Šalinac and Kulič, and also - in a wide bend - by a former meander of the Velika Morava which is now an oxbow lake.

It contains a tall, homogeneous stand of trees which are almost the same age, including about 200 centennial marsh oak trees (Quercus robur), once accompanied by field ash trees (Fraxinus angustifolia).

The grove's age is estimated at 200–300 years. The average size of the oak trees is:

External links
Aerial view

References

Protected areas of Serbia
Forests of Serbia